So um tempo is the debut album by the French-based Brazilian/Cape Verde duo Flavel & Neto. It was released on 28 June 2013 on Jive Epic, an affiliate of Sony Music. In France it was released by Sony Music.

The album contains the two major hits of Flavel & Neto, namely their version of "Eu Quero Tchu, Eu Quero Tcha" and both Portuguese and French versions of Pedida Perfeita (Tararatata)". The album stayed three weeks in SNEP, the official French Albums Chart peaking at number 156. It also reached number 56 on French iTunes Chart in downloads.

Track listing
"Eu quero tchu, eu quero tcha" (3:07)	
"Emmène-moi" (feat. Sylja "La GT") (3:34)	
"Da so um tempo" (3:38)	
"Tele-novela" (3:30)	
"Le soleir donne" (3:44)	
"Oh princess" (2:46)	
"Laisse tomber les filles" (3:30)	
"Vai dançar" (feat. Speed) (3:21)	
Pedida perfeita (Tararatata)" (Version portugaise) (feat. Anna Torres (2:52)	
"Bomba" (3:22)	
"Toca na mao" (3:25)	
Pedida perfeita (Tararatata)" (Version française) (feat. Anna Torres (2:52)

Charts

References

2013 debut albums
Flavel & Neto albums